Kévin Anin (born 5 July 1986) is a French former professional footballer who played as a midfielder.

Career
A product of the Le Havre youth system which has helped develop the likes of Lassana Diarra and Charles N'Zogbia in recent years, Anin began his career in 1999 at Le Havre AC. Following his club's relegation to Ligue 2, a number of French sides, including Bordeaux, Auxerre, Sochaux and Rennes, made offers for the midfield player who had a trial at Tottenham Hotspur.

After spending a 1.5-year spell at Sochaux Anin moved to OGC Nice on a four-year contract on 18 January 2012.

Road accident
On 4 June 2013, Anin was involved in a road accident on the A28 motorway situated around 60 kilometres north-east of Rouen. He was reportedly asleep in the back of the car when the driver lost control of the vehicle. Anin suffered arm and spinal injuries and was initially placed in an induced coma. He spent a month receiving treatment in hospital before being released to begin rehabilitation. As a result of the car crash, he remained paralysed from the waist down forcing him to quit his football career. He still maintained hope to regain control of his legs one day.

References

External links
 
 
 
 
 
 

Living people
1986 births
French people of Martiniquais descent
French footballers
Footballers from Le Havre
Association football midfielders
Ligue 1 players
Ligue 2 players
Le Havre AC players
FC Sochaux-Montbéliard players
OGC Nice players